GRIDSERVE Sustainable Energy Limited is a British company founded in 2017 to develop, own and operate critical infrastructure for sustainable energy production. Gridserve opened the UK's first all-electric car charging forecourt in 2020, and plans to open over 100 more over the following five years to charge electric vehicles with 100% renewable energy, supporting the UK's transition to carbon neutrality.

Activities
According to its website, Gridserve :
 acts as a vendor and comparison site for the leasing of electric vehicles with Hitachi Capital Vehicle Solutions, with 100 trees planted for every car leased. Leased EV customers have the full cost of charging at Gridserve electric forecourts covered.
 installs and operates a network of electric charging hubs and home chargers. A £1bn UK-wide investment is planned to build over 100 public charging stations.
 operates photovoltaic power stations, also known as solar farms, supplying renewable electricity to the National Grid. The solar modules are bifacial, allowing them to harvest energy from both sides of the panel. Land at Clay Hill, Bedfordshire serves as one of the UK's first subsidy-free solar farms, coming online in 2017 and comprising 10MW of solar PV and 6MW of energy storage. A solar farm was also constructed by GRIDSERVE for Warrington Borough Council at a site near Easingwold, York.

Electric forecourts

In advance of the UK mandatory phase-out of fossil fuel vehicles by 2030 and anticipated mass adoption of electric vehicles, Gridserve is developing a countrywide network of customer-focused forecourts that provide ultra-fast electric vehicle charging services and associated retail. Revenue and profitability are designed to derive from electricity grid balancing services and the provision of solar energy generation. However, the company pointedly does not call them service stations; the planned forecourts are intended to serve local communities, like petrol stations do, rather than serving passing trade on motorways. Facilities include convenience stores, office 'pods', exercise bikes to power the site, a children's play area and shower facilities.

Gridserve's electric forecourts have a standard rate of 24p per kilowatt-hour of clean electricity, less than the lowest previous rates available, making a typical charge from 20% to 80% of battery capacity cost under £10.

The first site of the planned network was opened on 7 December 2020 next to the A131 in Great Notley, near Braintree, Essex, receiving national media attention. It is paired with the solar farm at Clay Hill to rapidly charge up to 36 vehicles with 100% renewable electricity. 20 minutes charging with the 350 kW chargers will give a customer 200 miles of range. Retailers at the site include WHSmith, Booths, Costa Coffee and the Post Office. It was funded by Hitachi Capital UK, Innovate UK and the Office for Zero Emission Vehicles (OZEV).

A second electric forecourt with a smaller footprint opened outside Norwich on 21 April 2022.

Electric Highway
In July 2021, it was announced that Gridserve had purchased Ecotricity's charging network "the Electric Highway" which has chargers at almost all UK motorway services. In the first phase, all Electric Highway sites were replaced with more modern devices and contactless payment. This was targeted for September 2021. In fact, most sites except for Welcome Break were upgraded by late 2021; the Welcome Break sites were delayed but completed by April 2022. 

In the next phase, Gridserve is adding "hubs" with 6 to 12 ultra-rapid chargers (up to 350kW) at many service areas. The first hub (Rugby) was built in 2021; as of May 2022, hubs have opened at Swansea, Exeter, Burton-in-Kendal and Thurrock, a further seven hubs are under construction, and ten have planning permission but not yet started construction.

References

External links
 
 

2017 establishments in England
British companies established in 2017
Companies based in Buckinghamshire
Electric power companies of England
Energy companies established in 2017
Renewable energy companies of England
Renewable resource companies established in 2017
Solar energy companies of the United Kingdom
Electric vehicle infrastructure developers
Charging stations